Guzmania rauhiana is a plant species in the genus Guzmania. This species is native to Colombia and Ecuador.

References

rauhiana
Flora of Ecuador
Flora of Colombia
Plants described in 1988